Bedford College may refer to: 

 Bedford College (Australia), a private vocational college based in Glebe, New South Wales, Australia, founded 1944
 Bedford College, Bedford, a further education college based in Bedford, England, founded 1959
 Bedford College of Higher Education, a former higher education college based in Bedford, England, active 1976–1994
 Bedford College, London, a university college in London, England, founded 1849, merged into Royal Holloway College 1985